This is a list of members of the Chamber of Deputies of Luxembourg between 2004 and 2009.  The Chamber of Deputies is Luxembourg's national legislature, and consists of sixty deputies. The members that served in the 2004–2009 legislature were elected in 2004.

The government during this legislature was the Juncker–Asselborn I Government, a coalition of CSV and LSAP.

Footnotes

2004-2009
Members of the Chamber of Deputies